Michael Brandon (born Michael Feldman; April 20, 1945) is an American actor. He is known for his role as James Dempsey in the British drama series Dempsey and Makepeace (1985–1986). His theatre credits include the original Broadway production of Does a Tiger Wear a Necktie? (1969), and playing Jerry Springer in the West End production of Jerry Springer: The Opera (2003–2004).

Early life
Brandon was born Michael Feldman in Brooklyn, New York, to Miriam (née Tumen) and Sol Feldman. At age nine, he and his family (brother Elliot and sister Debra Lynne) moved to Valley Stream, New York where he attended Memorial Junior High and graduated from Valley Stream Central High School. Brandon then attended the American Academy of Dramatic Arts and made his debut on Broadway before turning to cinema.  He is of Jewish extraction.

Career
Brandon starred in the TV series Dempsey and Makepeace and Dinotopia, the movies Quattro mosche di velluto grigio (1971), F.M. (1978), A Vacation In Hell (1979) and A Change of Seasons (1980), and the plays Does a Tiger Wear a Necktie? and Jerry Springer - The Opera. 
Since moving to the UK, Brandon has worked in television shows such as The Bill, Trial and Retribution, and Dead Man Weds. He also played the title role in the musical Jerry Springer: The Opera for over a year in the National Theatre and after its transfer into the West End. Brandon starred in Singin' in the Rain in the summer of 2012.

In 2004, He became the fourth U.S. narrator of the children's television series Thomas & Friends from 2004 to 2012, replacing Alec Baldwin. In February 2008, he began his talk radio show on City Talk (now Greatest Hits Radio Liverpool & The North West), a new local radio station in Liverpool. In 2008, he appeared in the Series 4 finale of the BBC's Doctor Who, as General Sanchez, a UNIT officer. Also in 2008, he appeared in the television series Bones, as Roger Frampton, an American millionaire.

In 2011, Brandon guest-starred in an episode of the BBC1 con drama Hustle as Marcus Wendell (series 7, episode 3).  Also in 2011, he was seen in a supporting role in the film Captain America: The First Avenger as a politician who befriends the titular character.  In September 2013 he appeared in the ITV dancing show Stepping Out with wife Glynis Barber. In 2017, he collaborated with producer/director Guy Masterson to create his autobiographical stand-up comedy, Off Ramps which hit at the 2017 Edinburgh Fringe Festival. In 2022, he appeared in an episode of Casualty on BBC1.

Personal life
In the early 1970s, Brandon was in a relationship with the actress Kim Novak. Brandon was married to actress Lindsay Wagner from 1976 to 1979. He has been married to actress Glynis Barber, with whom he co-starred in Dempsey & Makepeace,  since 18 November 1989. They remain in the United Kingdom. The couple have a son, Alex.

Filmography

Film

Television

Video games

Theatre

References

External links

American male film actors
American male voice actors
American male television actors
American expatriates in England
Male actors from New York City
People from Brooklyn
Valley Stream Central High School alumni
1945 births
Living people
American expatriate male actors in the United Kingdom